Dominik Reimann (born 18 June 1997) is a German professional footballer who plays as a goalkeeper for 1. FC Magdeburg.

Club career
In May 2018, Reimann moved from Borussia Dortmund II to 2. Bundesliga club Holstein Kiel, signing a three-year contract lasting until 30 June 2021. He made his professional debut for Kiel in the 2. Bundesliga on 15 March 2019, starting in the home match against Erzgebirge Aue, which finished as a 5–1 win.

International career
In October 2014, Reimann was called up to the Poland under-18 national team, though he did not make an appearance. Following this, he switched to representing Germany, making his under-18 debut on 13 November 2018 in a 4–0 friendly win against the Netherlands.

Reimann was included in hosts Germany's squad for the 2016 UEFA European Under-19 Championship in July 2016. He made two appearances in the group stage, with Germany being eliminated from title contention but ultimately still qualifying for the 2017 FIFA U-20 World Cup.

In 2017, Reimann was included in Germany's squad for the 2017 FIFA U-20 World Cup in South Korea. He made one appearance in the group stage of the tournament, a 2–0 loss to eventual runners-up Venezuela in Germany's opening match. Germany went on to reach the round of 16 of the tournament, where they were eliminated by Zambia following a 4–3 loss after extra time.

Personal life
Reimann was born in Münster, North Rhine-Westphalia and is of Polish descent.

Honours
1. FC Magdeburg
3. Liga: 2021–22

References

External links
 
 
 

1997 births
Living people
German people of Polish descent
Sportspeople from Münster
Footballers from North Rhine-Westphalia
Polish footballers
German footballers
Association football goalkeepers
Germany youth international footballers
Borussia Dortmund II players
Borussia Dortmund players
Holstein Kiel players
Holstein Kiel II players
1. FC Magdeburg players
2. Bundesliga players
3. Liga players
Regionalliga players